Mericien Venzon (born August 22, 1991) from Hayward, California, United States is a figure skater who represented the Philippines. She qualified to the free skate at the 2011 Four Continents Championships. She was the senior women's champion at the 2009 Philippine Figure Skating Championships.

Personal life
Mericien Venzon was born in Hayward, California. She attended Moreau Catholic High School and graduated in the Class of 2009. She graduated from the University of California, Los Angeles, with highest distinctions. Currently, she is a fellow with the Society and Genetics Institute.

Competitive highlights

References

External links 
Mericien Venzon ISU bio

Filipino female single skaters
Living people
1991 births
Sportspeople from Hayward, California
Figure skaters at the 2011 Asian Winter Games